Elgin High School may refer to one of several high schools: 

In Canada:
Central Elgin Collegiate Institute — St. Thomas, Ontario
Elgin Park Secondary School — Surrey, British Columbia

In Scotland:
Elgin High School (Scotland) — Elgin, Moray
Elgin Academy, Scotland — Elgin, Moray

In the United States:
Elgin High School (Illinois) — Elgin, Illinois
Elgin High School (Minnesota) — Elgin, Minnesota
Elgin High School (Nebraska) — Elgin, Nebraska
Elgin High School (Ohio) — Marion, Ohio
Elgin High School (Oklahoma) — Elgin, Oklahoma
Elgin High School (Oregon) — Elgin, Oregon
Elgin High School (North Dakota) — Elgin, North Dakota
Elgin High School (Texas) — Elgin, Texas
Lugoff-Elgin High School in Lugoff, South Carolina
South Elgin High School — South Elgin, Illinois